There have been four United States Navy ships named USS Pensacola:
The first  was a steamer launched in 1859 and was decommissioned in 1911.
The second  was a German steamer seized when the United States entered World War I and used as a transport.
The third  was a cruiser launched in 1926 that served until the end of World War II.
The fourth  was a landing ship launched in 1971 and decommissioned in 1999.

United States Navy ship names